Sixmile Village is a populated place situated in Mohave County, Arizona, United States, just south of the border with Utah.

References

Populated places in Mohave County, Arizona